The W. A. (Western Australian) Champion Fillies Stakes is a Perth Racing Group 3 Thoroughbred horse race for three year old fillies at set weights held over 1600 metres, held at Ascot Racecourse, Perth, Western Australia each year in November. Total prize money is A$200,000.

History

 In 2003 the race was run at Belmont Park Racecourse.

Grade
1946–1978 - Principal race
1978–1996 - Group 2
1997 onwards - Group 3

Distance
1946–1971 - 1 mile (~1600 metres)
1972 onwards - 1600 metres

Winners

 2021 - Searchin' Roc's 
 2020 - Watch Me Dance 
 2019 - Tuscan Queen 
 2018 - Arcadia Queen
 2017 - Art Series
 2016 - Samovare
 2015 - Perfect Reflection
 2014 - Delicacy
 2013 - Miss Rose De Lago
 2012 - Fuddle Dee Duddle
 2011 (Nov.) - Eight Till Late
 2011 (Feb.) - Dreamaway
 2010 - Le Plunge
 2009 - Danebeela
 2008 - Spirited One
 2007 - race not held
 2006 - Catechuchu
 2005 - Hi On Love
 2004 - Stormy Nova
 2003 - Spirited Lady
 2002 - Superior Star
 2001 (Nov.) - Tribula
 2001 (Apr.) - Miss Precisely
 2000 - Ellendale
 1999 - Kim Angel
 1998 - Calophylia
 1997 - Duendee
 1996 - Mercurial Madam
 1995 - Dance Hi
 1994 - Zabanella
 1993 - Prime Again
 1992 - Chancery Star
 1991 - Oh Pretty Woman
 1990 - Strip The Moon
 1989 - Lady Of Battle
 1988 - Surfside Lady
 1987 - Another Omen
 1986 - Dance Act
 1985 - Jungle Mist
 1984 - Entrancing
 1983 - Taj Bell
 1982 - Frivolous Lass
 1981 - All There Is
 1980 - Queen Inca
 1979 - Brechin Castle
 1978 - Mingurie
 1977 - race not held
 1976 - Bynsaab
 1975 - Not Amused
 1974 - Fondness
 1973 - Our Pocket
 1972 - Starglow
 1971 - Irish Faith
 1970 - Arborescent
 1969 - Polo Jane
 1968 - La Trice
 1967 - Merry Flute
 1966 - Fair Dollar
 1965 - Muette
 1964 - Kev's Folly
 1963 - Dinna Tell
 1962 - Astra Vista
 1961 - Carol Vista
 1960 - Blue Rose
 1959 - Queen Of The May
 1958 - Countess Blanche
 1957 - Cheeky Jan
 1956 - Lady Orator
 1955 - Dawdie
 1955 - Maniana
 1953 - Copper Beech
 1953 - Stockette
 1952 - Chestnut Lady
 1951 - Roman Maid
 1950 - Prediction
 1949 - Jennie
 1948 - Laroette
 1947 - Lady Lucia
 1946 - Burabudy

See also

 List of Australian Group races
 Group races

Notes

Horse races in Australia
Flat horse races for three-year-olds
Sport in Perth, Western Australia